Dato' Dr. Hasan bin Mohamed Ali (variant spellings include Hassan Mohd Ali, born 28 November 1947) is a Malaysian politician and formerly the State Assemblyman for Gombak Setia in Selangor. He was a member of the Pan-Malaysian Islamic Party (PAS) and the Selangor State EXCO until his dismissal in January 2012.

Early life and career
Born in the town of Klang, Hasan graduated from the University of Malaya in 1971 and obtained his PhD from the University of Wisconsin–Madison in 1985. Before entering politics, he was a member of the public service nearly 20 years, and served various positions in the Selangor state government and Prime Minister's Department. He has also appeared as a panel member for various talk shows aired on RTM and TV3.

Political career
Hasan joined the Pan-Malaysian Islamic Party (PAS) after leaving public service and subsequently became a vice-president in 2001. He was elected a central working committee member in 2009 and was the party's leader in Selangor until 2011.

In the 1999 general elections, Hasan contested two seats: the Sungai Burung state seat in Selangor and the Parit Buntar parliamentary seat in Perak, and won both. However, he lost both of them in the next elections, as PAS suffered heavy losses throughout the nation.

In 2008, Hasan won the Gombak Setia state seat in Selangor. PAS went on to form a coalition government with Parti Keadilan Rakyat and the Democratic Action Party, and Hasan was appointed as a state executive councillor (EXCO), holding the Islamic Affairs, Malay Customs, Infrastructure and Public Amenities portfolio. During his tenure, Hasan has openly criticised the state government on a few occasions, and has been accused of harbouring ambitions of becoming Menteri Besar of Selangor himself. In 2011, he broke ranks with the Pakatan Rakyat state government again after speaking out in support of a raid on a church event.

In December 2011, Hasan criticised PAS in UMNO-owned media for purportedly abandoning its Islamist credentials. On 8 January 2012, the PAS central working committee sacked Hasan from the party for "persistently going against [its] stand." He was also dismissed from the state EXCO. After his dismissal, he officially founded on 21 February 2012 Jalur Tiga (JATI) a non-profit organisation (NGO) on the pretext of defending the Islam religion, Malay dominance and Malay Rulers, for his politic movement but to no success.

Election results

Honours

Honours of Malaysia
  :
  Knight Companion of the Order of the Crown of Pahang (DIMP) – Dato' (1995)
  :
  Knight Commander of the Order of the Crown of Selangor (DPMS) – Dato' (2011)

See also
 Jalur Tiga (JATI)

References

External links
 Gombak Setia service centre blog

1947 births
Living people
Malaysian people of Malay descent
Malaysian Muslims
People from Selangor
Former Malaysian Islamic Party politicians
Members of the Dewan Rakyat
Members of the Selangor State Legislative Assembly
Selangor state executive councillors
University of Malaya alumni
University of Wisconsin–Madison alumni
Knights Commander of the Order of the Crown of Selangor